Gilberto Carlos Marangoni Filho (born 1 February 1990), better known as Gilberto Alemão, is a Brazilian footballer who plays for Clube do Remo as a centre-back.

References

External links
 
 

Living people
1990 births
Brazilian footballers
Rio Claro Futebol Clube players
Associação Desportiva Recreativa e Cultural Icasa players
Mogi Mirim Esporte Clube players
Volta Redonda FC players
Clube Atlético Bragantino players
Felda United F.C. players
Campeonato Brasileiro Série B players
Expatriate footballers in Malaysia
Association football central defenders